Vitex triflora is a species of tree in the family Lamiaceae. It is native to Panama and South America.

References

triflora
Trees of Peru
Trees of Argentina
Trees of Ecuador
Trees of Colombia
Trees of Paraguay
Trees of Brazil
Trees of Venezuela
Trees of Guyana
Trees of Bolivia
Trees of French Guiana
Trees of Suriname